Mundys Corner is an unincorporated community and census-designated place in Jackson Township, Cambria County, Pennsylvania, United States. As of the 2010 census, the population was 1,651 residents.

It is located near the intersection of U.S. Route 22 and Pennsylvania Route 271. US 22 leads east  to Ebensburg, the Cambria County seat, and west  to Blairsville. PA 271 leads north  to Nanty Glo and southwest  to Johnstown.

Demographics

References

Census-designated places in Cambria County, Pennsylvania
Census-designated places in Pennsylvania